Yerambam was an ancient mathematical treatise in the Tamil language. It was among the few ancient Tamil works on mathematics such as the work of Kanakkadhigaram and the manuscripts of Kilvaai and Kulimaattru.

The work
Yerambam was one of the works in the corpus of ancient Tamil mathematical works, which includes several other works such as Kilaralaabam, Adhisaram, Kalambagam, Thribuvana Thilagam, Kanidha Rathinam, and Sirukanakku. In addition to these, there were two other works for which the name of the author is known: Kanakku Nool by Kaakkai Paadiniyaar and Kanakkadhigaram by Kaarinaayanar.

Kaarinaayanar cites Yerambam and the six other works in the ancient corpus as the sources of his work Kanakkadhigaram.

According to Devaneya Pavanar, the work is completely lost to modern times.

See also 
 Tamil literature

References

External links 
 Yerambam, Tamil Wiktionary entry

Sangam literature
Books about mathematics
Ancient Indian mathematical works